The transgender military ban in the United States under President Donald Trump took several forms. This is a list of articles covering the subject.

 Directive-type Memorandum-19-004 (March 2019), the U.S. Department of Defense memorandum effectively restricting most transgender applicants from April 2019 to March 2020
 Presidential Memorandum on Military Service by Transgender Individuals (August 25, 2017), initial presidential memorandum prohibiting open military service of transgender individuals
 Presidential Memorandum on Military Service by Transgender Individuals (March 23, 2018), second presidential memorandum transferring the authority to enact a ban to the Department of Defense